Sergei Vasilievich Pryakhin (sometimes Priakin; ; born December 7, 1963) is a Russian former ice hockey forward who played 20 seasons in several leagues.  He is a former captain of Krylya Sovetov Moscow (Soviet Wings) of the Soviet League and was first Soviet hockey player given permission to play in the National Hockey League (NHL), and the second Soviet player to appear in an NHL game, following Victor Nechayev. He joined the Calgary Flames in 1989 and played parts of three seasons in the NHL. Pryakhin returned to Europe in 1991 where he spent three seasons in Switzerland with Zürcher SC, then four in Finland with Kiekko-Espoo. He also played with the Oji Eagles in Japan for one year before returning to Kryla for a final season before retiring in 2000.

Internationally, Pryakhin was a member of the Soviet national team.  He appeared in two World Junior Championships and won a gold medal in 1983.  He was a member of two World Championship teams, winning a silver medal in 1987 and gold in 1990.  Pryakhin was also a member of the second place Soviet team at the 1987 Canada Cup.

Playing career
Pryakhin's top level career began in 1980 when he appeared in one Soviet League for Krylya Sovetov Moscow (better known in North America as the Soviet Wings). He joined the team full-time in 1981–82 as a 17-year-old, appearing in 43 games for the Wings. Pryakhin's debut with the Soviet national team came the 1982 World Junior Hockey Championship in a fourth-place finish.  He returned for the 1983 tournament and scored six points in seven games to help the Soviets win the gold medal.

A mid-level player on both the Wings and the national team, Pryakhin's best seasons in the Soviet league came in 1983–84 when he scored 18 goals, and 1986–87 when he had 32 points. He ultimately rose to become captain of the Wings. He was a member of a Soviet squad that won a silver medal at the 1987 World Championship and finished as runners-up to Canada at the 1987 Canada Cup.

The National Hockey League (NHL)'s Calgary Flames, anticipating that it would be easier to convince the Soviet Hockey Federation to release a non-star member of their national team to play in North America, opted to select Pryakhin with the 252nd, and last, pick in the 1988 NHL Entry Draft. The Soviets began negotiations with the Flames in February 1989, and he signed a contract with Calgary on March 29.  He became the first Soviet player permitted by his national federation to play in the NHL. Pryakhin made his NHL debut on March 31 against the Winnipeg Jets. He was the second Soviet player to appear in an NHL game, following Victor Nechayev. Pryahkin appeared in the Flames' final two games of the regular season, and one game of the 1989 playoffs as the Flames went on to win the Stanley Cup.  He did not play enough games or in the finals so his name was left off the Cup.  Calgary did give Pryakhin a Stanley Cup ring, and included him on the team picture.

Pryahkin scored his first NHL goal on October 10, 1989, against the New Jersey Devils. He appeared in 20 games with the Flames in 1989–90 and scored 2 goals and 4 points.  He added 1 goal and 6 assists in 24 games in 1990–91 and made appearances with the Salt Lake Golden Eagles, Calgary's International Hockey League affiliate in both seasons. Internationally, Pryahkin appeared in three games and won a gold medal with the Soviet team at the 1990 World Championship.

Returning to Europe in 1991–92, Pryahkin joined Zürcher SC of the Swiss top division.  He was a member of the team for three seasons, splitting 1992–93 with Krylya Sovetov in his Russian home, before moving onto the Finnish SM-liiga for four seasons with Kiekko-Espoo. Pryahkin spent a season in Japan in 1998–99 before closing out his career with Krylya Sovetov in the Russian second division in 2000.

Career statistics

Regular season and playoffs

International

References
Career statistics:

External links 

1963 births
Calgary Flames draft picks
Calgary Flames players
Espoo Blues players
Krylya Sovetov Moscow players
Living people
Oji Eagles players
Russian ice hockey right wingers
Salt Lake Golden Eagles (IHL) players
Soviet expatriate ice hockey players
Soviet expatriate sportspeople in Canada
Soviet ice hockey right wingers
Ice hockey people from Moscow
Stanley Cup champions
ZSC Lions players
Soviet expatriate sportspeople in the United States
Expatriate ice hockey players in the United States
Expatriate ice hockey players in Canada
Russian expatriate ice hockey people
Russian expatriate sportspeople in Switzerland
Russian expatriate sportspeople in Finland
Russian expatriate sportspeople in Japan
Expatriate ice hockey players in Japan
Expatriate ice hockey players in Switzerland
Expatriate ice hockey players in Finland